Fuji News Network (FNN) is a Japanese commercial television network run by Fuji Television Network, Inc., part of the Fujisankei Communications Group. The network's responsibility includes the syndication of national television news bulletins to its regional affiliates, and news exchange between the stations.

Distribution of non-news television programmes is handled by Fuji Network System (FNS), another network set up by Fuji TV.

History
The network formed in October 3, 1966 which comprised 7 television stations: Fuji TV (the flagship station), Sendai Television, Tōkai TV, Kansai TV, Hiroshima Telecasting (now affiliated with NNN and NNS), Nihonkai Telecasting, and Television Nishinippon Corporation.

Presently the network has 26 full members, and two (Television Oita System Co., Ltd and TV Miyazaki). In terms of the number of participating stations, it is the third largest in Japan, following NNN (NTN group) and JNN (TBS-group). FNS does not currently have any affiliates in four prefectures: Aomori, Yamanashi, Yamaguchi, and Tokushima.

Fuji News Network stations

Former stations 
Bold indicates former primary affiliate

References

External links 
   

 
24-hour television news channels in Japan
Television channels and stations established in 1966